Evgeny Evgenyevich Donskoy (born 9 May 1990) is a Russian professional tennis player. His career-high ATP singles ranking is world No. 65, achieved on 8 July 2013, after winning five Challenger events throughout the previous year.

Personal life
He was born and currently resides in Moscow, Russia. Donskoy was mentored by former player and two-time Grand Slam champion Marat Safin. His favourite surface is hard courts.

Career
In 2010, Donskoy played doubles with the British player Morgan Phillips at the Seville Challenger, losing in the first round.

By 2013, Marat Safin had built a coaching team for Donskoy that included Morgan Phillips.

Donskoy entered 2013 Australian Open's main draw for the first time, reaching the third round and defeating 23rd seed Mikhail Youzhny en route. He also pushed Andy Murray to three sets in the Indian Wells Masters 1000 event.
Consequently, Donskoy made his Davis Cup debut in Europe/Africa Zone Group I match against Great Britain in Coventry. Donskoy won the first rubber against James Ward, 4–6, 4–6, 7–5, 6–2, 8–6, to help give Russia a 2–0 lead heading into the doubles rubber the following day. Great Britain won the doubles rubber, where Ward opened the day. Ward defeated Dmitry Tursunov, 6–4, 5–7, 5–7, 6–4, 6–4, to level the tie. Dan Evans ranked No. 325 would eventually complete a turnaround, with a straight sets victory over world no. 80 Donskoy.

Also for the first time, Donskoy entered the 2013 French Open's main draw, beating Jan-Lennard Struff in the first round. At the 2013 TOPSHELF Open held in 's-Hertogenbosch, he took out third seed John Isner in the first round and beat Robin Haase in the second to reach his first ATP Tour quarterfinals.

In December 2014, Donskoy decided to join the team of Boris Sobkin, coach of Mikhail Youzhny.

In 2016, Donskoy debuted at the Summer Olympics. He defeated 7th seed David Ferrer in the second round, but then lost to Steve Johnson in the third.

In 2017, Donskoy beat Australian Open champion Roger Federer in the second round of the Dubai Tennis Championships, having saved three match points in the second set, trailing 5–2 in the final set and down 5–1 in the final set tie-breaker. This was Donskoy's first career win over a top-ten player.

At the 2021 US Open he qualified for his ninth consecutive main draw appearance at this Major. He lost to Felix Auger-Aliassime in the first round.

Style of play
Donskoy has very powerful, flat groundstrokes, especially his forehand, which can produce spectacular points but also a lot of unforced errors.

Challenger and Futures finals

Singles: 24 (14–10)

Doubles: 11 (5–6)

Performance timeline

Current through the 2022 Australian Open.

Singles

Doubles

National representation

Davis Cup (5–6)

   indicates the outcome of the Davis Cup match followed by the score, date, place of event, the zonal classification and its phase, and the court surface.

ATP Cup (0–2)

Wins over top 10 players

Record against top 10 players
Donskoy's match record against those who have been ranked in the top 10. Players who have been No. 1 are in boldface.

As of 21 July 2021

  Mikhail Youzhny 2–1
  Marcos Baghdatis 1–0
  Roger Federer 1–0
  Stefanos Tsitsipas 1–0
  Jürgen Melzer 1–1                                                   
  Lucas Pouille 1–1
  Tommy Robredo 1–1
  David Ferrer 1–2
  John Isner 1–2
  James Blake 0–1
  Mardy Fish 0–1
  Richard Gasquet 0–1
  David Goffin 0–1
  Tommy Haas 0–1
  Lleyton Hewitt 0–1 
  Andy Murray 0–1
  Milos Raonic 0–1
  Gilles Simon 0–1
  Dominic Thiem 0–1
  Pablo Carreño Busta 0–2
  Kei Nishikori 0–2
  Alexander Zverev 0–2
  Marin Čilić 0–3                                                
  Kevin Anderson 0–5

Team titles
2021
 Davis Cup winner with Russia
 ATP Cup winner with Russia

Awards
2019
 The Russian Cup in the nomination Team of the Year

References

External links
 
 
 

1990 births
Living people
Tennis players from Moscow
Russian male tennis players
Tennis players at the 2016 Summer Olympics
Olympic tennis players of Russia
Universiade medalists in tennis
Universiade bronze medalists for Russia
Medalists at the 2009 Summer Universiade